The Sarmatian Review (formerly Houston Sarmatian) was a triannual peer-reviewed academic journal covering Slavistics (the study of the histories, cultures, and societies of the Slavic nations of Central, Eastern, and Southern Europe). It was published from 1981 to 2017 by the nonprofit Polish Institute of Houston. Since 1992 an abbreviated web edition has been available, free of charge, six to ten weeks after the publication of the print edition. The editor-in-chief was Ewa Thompson.

History
The journal was established in 1981, under the auspices of the Houston chapter of the Polish Institute of Arts and Sciences of America, as The Houston Sarmatian, obtaining its current title in 1988. In 1999 a nonprofit public foundation, the Polish Institute of Houston, was formed as a cultural and educational institution with the chief purpose of continuing the publication of the journal.

The journal took its name from "Sarmatia", a semi-legendary appellation for the Polish–Lithuanian Commonwealth, a multicultural state that included most of Eastern Europe from the 16th to the 18th century.

Content
The journal concerns itself with the Slavic countries (most prominently Poland, Russia, and Ukraine), the post-Soviet period, American and European ethnic questions, and matters related to mass media, higher education, literature, government, religion, and politics. The journal publishes articles, reviews, and occasionally poetry samples.

See also
The Polish Review
Sarmatism
Slavic Review

References

External links

Correspondences between Melchior Wańkowicz and Jerzy Giedroyc, Sarmatian Review, September 1999

Slavic studies journals
Publications established in 1981
1981 establishments in Texas
Publications disestablished in 2017
2017 disestablishments in Texas
Triannual journals